Doug Martindale (born May 25, 1947) is a politician in Manitoba, Canada.  He has been a member of the Legislative Assembly of Manitoba since 1990, serving as a member of the New Democratic Party.

Early life and career

Martindale was born in Brockville, Ontario.  He holds a Bachelor of Arts degree from Brock University (1973) and a Master of Divinity degree from Victoria University (1976).  He is an ordained United Church minister, and has practiced in Saskatchewan (1976–80) and at a mission in north-end Winnipeg (1980–90).  He has been involved in several outreach programs among Winnipeg's poor and aboriginal communities, and remains active in efforts to combat homelessness.  He helped to convert St. John's United Church into a co-op apartment complex, and was a founding member of Inner City Voice newspaper.  In the legislature, he has served as Chair of the Justice, Social and Economic Development Committees.

In 1973, he married Carol Wachniak. The couple has two children.

Martindale defeated incumbent MLA Conrad Santos to win the New Democratic Party nomination for the northwest Winnipeg division of Burrows in the 1988 provincial election.  He was defeated in the general election by Liberal candidate William Chornopyski.  The seat had previously been regarded as safe for the NDP, but local divisions and a provincial swing away from the party contributed to Martindale's defeat.

Opposition member

NDP support had recovered somewhat by the 1990 election, and Martindale was able to defeat Chornopyski in a rematch.  The Progressive Conservatives won a majority government under Gary Filmon, and Martindale served in the official opposition as his party's critic for family services and housing.  He opposed the Filmon government's cuts to child welfare and education support, and called for an inquiry into allegations of emotional abuse and unethical treatment at the Osborne House battered women's shelter.  He also criticized the government's introduction of a "welfare fraud hotline", describing it as "punitive and unnecessary" and noting that Manitoba lost far more money each year to income tax fraud.  Nonetheless, Martindale supported the government's early intervention policy as a means of keeping more children with their families and out of the supervision of Child and Family Services.

Martindale was re-elected in the 1995 general election, as the Progressive Conservatives won a second majority government across the province.  He continued to serve as family services critic, and opposed another round of child welfare cuts introduced by the Filmon government later in the year.  When the government introduced further benefit cuts of up to 10% for single, employable people, Martindale described Filmon's administration as the "cruelest, most heartless government in Canada".  In 1999, he and fellow NDP MLA Diane McGifford organized consultative meetings of parents and day-care providers.

Government backbencher

The New Democratic Party won a majority government in the 1999 general election under the leadership of Gary Doer.  Martindale was easily re-elected in Burrows, defeating controversial school trustee Mike Babinsky of the Liberal Party.  He served as a backbench supporter of the Doer government.  In 2002, he was appointed to a four-member task force seeking public input on the future of the province's mining and petroleum sectors.  There was some speculation that he would be appointed to cabinet after his re-election in 2003, but this did not occur.

In 2004, Martindale brought forward a parliamentary motion urging the provincial government to declare the last Saturday of November as Day of the Ukrainian Famine/Genocide, commemorating the victims of the Holodomor of 1932-33.  He was an international observer to the Ukrainian presidential election in December 2004.

Martindale was re-elected in the 2007 provincial election.

In 2011, he announced that he would not be seeking reelection. Martindale said that he would be teaching at Booth University College and Providence University College, and would return to preaching as a United Church minister.

Federal politics

Martindale supported Lorne Nystrom's bid to become leader of the federal New Democratic Party in 1995, and endorsed Bill Blaikie in 2003.

Trivia

Martindale played the role of J.S. Woodsworth during a 1994 commemoration of the 1919 Winnipeg General Strike.
Since 2001, Martindale has taken part in a challenge organized by Evangelicals for Social Action to fast and pray during the Muslim holy month of Ramadan.  He has called for greater dialogue between Christian and Muslim groups.

Electoral record

All electoral information is taken from Elections Manitoba.  Expenditures refer to candidate expenses.

Footnotes

External links
Party biography

1947 births
Brock University alumni
Living people
New Democratic Party of Manitoba MLAs
Ministers of the United Church of Canada
People from Brockville
Politicians from Winnipeg
21st-century Canadian politicians